Cevico Navero is a municipality  in the province of Palencia, Castile and León, Spain. According to the 2009 data  (INE), the municipality has a population of 234  inhabitants.

Main sights
Church of Nuestra Señora de la Paz, built in Romanesque style in the 12th-13th centuries (of this period
Ruins of the Monastery of San Pelayo de Cerrato, built in the 10th century

References

Municipalities in the Province of Palencia